One Hell of a Ride is a four-disc box set by country singer Willie Nelson, released on April 1, 2008.

Track listing

Disc one 
"When I've Sang My Last Hillbilly Song" - 1:30
"No Place for Me" - 1:20
"Man With the Blues" - 2:07
"Nite Life" - 2:32 
"Hello Walls" - 2:25
"Funny How Time Slips Away" - 3:04
"Crazy" - 2:53
"Half a Man" - 2:27
"Mr. Record Man" - 2:41
"One in a Row" - 2:34
"The Party's Over" - 2:26
"Texas in My Soul" - 2:02
"Good Times" - 2:29
"Sweet Memories" - 3:51
"Little Things" - 3:19
"Any Old Arms Won't Do" - 2:33
"Everybody's Talkin'" - 3:25
"Pins and Needles (In My Heart)" - 3:20
"Once More with Feeling" - 2:39
"I Gotta Get Drunk" - 2:51
"Laying My Burdens Down" - 2:39
"What Can You Do to Me Now" - 3:29
"Kneel at the Feet of Jesus" - 2:48
"I'm a Memory" - 2:26
"Family Bible" - 3:13 	
"Summer of Roses" - 2:07
"Yesterday's Wine" - 3:14
"Me and Paul" - 3:15
"The Words Don't Fit the Picture" - 2:46

Disc two 
"Good Hearted Woman" (w/ Waylon Jennings) - 2:59
"You Left a Long, Long Time Ago" - 2:41
"She's Not for You" - 2:32
"You Ought to Hear Me Cry" - 2:42
"It Should Be Easier Now" - 2:47
"Mammas Don't Let Your Babies Grow Up to Be Cowboys" (w/ Waylon Jennings) - 3:28
"If You Can't Touch Her At All" (w/ Waylon Jennings) - 3:04
"I Can Get Off On You" (w/ Waylon Jennings) - 2:25
"Blackjack County Chain" - 2:03
"Johnny One Time" - 2:45
"Bring Me Sunshine" - 2:31
"I Just Can't Let You Say Goodbye" - 2:46
"Shotgun Willie" - 2:44
"Sad Songs and Waltzes" - 3:08
"The Troublemaker" - 1:53
"Uncloudy Day" - 4:41
"Bloody Mary Morning" - 2:15
"I Still Can't Believe You're Gone" - 4:20
"Blue Eyes Crying in the Rain" - 2:12
"I'd Have To Be Crazy" - 3:27
"If You've Got the Money I've Got the Time" - 2:06
"Always Late (With Your Kisses)" - 2:26
"She's Gone, Gone, Gone" - 2:32
"I Never Go Around Mirrors" - 2:37
"Stardust" - 3:53
"Georgia on My Mind" - 4:12

Disc three 
"Whiskey River" (Live, April 1978) - 3:34
"Till I Gain Control Again" (Live, April 1978) - 5:53
"Stay a Little Longer" (Live, April 1978) -  3:28
"Heartbreak Hotel" (w/ Leon Russell) - 3:02
"One For My Baby (And One More For The Road)" (w/ Leon Russell) - 2:36
"Help Me Make It Through the Night" - 4:01
"My Heroes Have Always Been Cowboys" - 3:07
"Crazy Arms" - 2:44
"On the Road Again" - 2:35
"Angel Flying Too Close to the Ground" - 4:30
"Mona Lisa" - 2:33
"I'm Gonna Sit Right Down and Write Myself a Letter" - 3:02
"Always on My Mind" - 3:34
"Pancho and Lefty" (w/ Merle Haggard) - 4:49
"Reasons to Quit" - 3:33
"In the Jailhouse Now" - 2:09
"Why Do I Have to Choose" - 3:31
"City of New Orleans" - 4:52
"To All the Girls I've Loved Before" (w/ Julio Igelsias) - 3:34
"Three Days" - 3:30

Disc four 
"Write Your Own Songs" - 3:20
"Seven Spanish Angels" (w/ Ray Charles) - 3:50
"Highwayman" (w/ Johnny Cash ; Kris Kristofferson ; Waylon Jennings) - 3:03
"Living in the Promiseland" - 3:23
"What a Wonderful World" - 2:46
"Country Willie" - 3:47
"Graceland" - 4:47
"Valentine" - 3:38
"What Was It You Wanted" - 5:27
"Still Is Still Moving to Me" - 3:33
"Too Sick to Pray" - 2:43
"Everywhere I Go" (w/ Emmylou Harris) - 3:53
"My Own Peculiar Way" - 3:40
"Nuages" - 3:41
"Rainbow Connection" - 4:32
"Mendocino County Line" (w/ Lee Ann Womack) - 4:34
"The Harder They Come" (w/ Toots & The Maytals) - 3:39
"Bubbles in My Beer" - 2:51
"When I've Sung My Last Hillbilly Song" - 3:27

Chart performance

Personnel 
Willie Nelson - Guitar, vocals

References

2008 compilation albums
Willie Nelson compilation albums
Columbia Records compilation albums